The 2008 GP2 Series season was the forty-second season of the second-tier of Formula One feeder championship and also fourth season under the GP2 Series moniker. It began on 26 April at Montmeló, Spain and it finished on 14 September at Monza, Italy. This is the first season using a new car design to be used during the following 3 seasons. The series was won by Giorgio Pantano.

Season summary
The fourth GP2 Series season started in Circuit de Catalunya. Pastor Maldonado took first pole position of the season, but he couldn't use the advantage after a very bad start. Alvaro Parente won in his debut race in the series. In the sprint race, Romain Grosjean was heading for victory until late-race safety car. When the safety car went back to the pits, Grosjean straight-lined chicane and lost momentum. He then blocked Kamui Kobayashi, receiving drive through penalty. Kobayashi won the race while Grosjean was left without points.

At Turkey, Giorgio Pantano won from pole in the feature race. Grosjean won the sprint race which included several accidents on the first lap, as well as two stray dogs on the track. One of them was hit by Bruno Senna whose car was damaged and he had to retire. Luckily Senna escaped without injury. Senna then won at Monaco, on the track where his uncle Ayrton had won six times. In the sprint race, which was held for the first time in Monaco, Mike Conway was victorious. He was heading for third place in feature race before being punted off by Javier Villa on the final lap. He was lucky in the event, as only eight drivers were unlapped, so he ended in eight and therefore for the pole in the sprint.

Magny-Cours feature race was won by Pantano after Grosjean and Senna suffered mechanical retirements. The sprint race started on damp track and few drivers gambled starting with slicks. This worked well for Arden drivers, as Sébastien Buemi won from 21st on the grid. His teammate Yelmer Buurman was second. At Silverstone Pantano won the feature again, and wet sprint race was dominated by Senna.

At Hockenheim Grosjean finished first on the road, but he was later penalized for overtaking under yellow flag, giving Pantano third straight feature race victory. Karun Chandhok won the sprint race from pole. At Hungaroring, Lucas di Grassi who had returned to GP2 in Magny-Cours, won the feature race, while Buemi won the sprint after polesitter Andy Soucek made a small mistake.

The feature race at Valencia ended in dramatic fashion. Pantano was on road for victory before he ran out of fuel on the final lap. Several other drivers suffered same fate, including Senna who could get his car over the finish line but in 9th place. Vitaly Petrov inherited the win. Pantano recovered well in sprint race to take third place while Senna crashed out. di Grassi was the winner.

With four races to go, Pantano led by 13 points on Senna and 20 on di Grassi. Senna took the pole in Spa, but his race was destroyed by drive through penalty for unsafe release by the team in his pit stop. Pantano suffered mechanical glitch during safety car and was dropped to back of the field. He was recovering until he collided with di Grassi on the final lap. Pantano was disqualified for the race and also excluded from the sprint. Grosjean won the feature while Maldonado took his first victory of the season in the sprint, overtaking Jérôme d'Ambrosio on the final lap.

Pantano got perfect start for final weekend with pole, therefore knocking di Grassi out from the championship hunt. A race started in wet conditions and mandatory pit stop was done as late as possible, as the track was ready for slicks. di Grassi won while Pantano ended in 10th after drive through penalty for crossing white line at the pit exit. It didn't matter much: while Senna couldn't finish better than 5th, Pantano clinched the title with one race to go. The sprint race was held in wet conditions as well and won by polesitter Davide Valsecchi.

Teams and drivers
All of the teams used the Dallara GP2/08 chassis with Renault-badged 4.0 litre (244 cu in) naturally-aspirated Mecachrome V8 engines order and with tyres supplied by Bridgestone. On 19 October 2007, it was announced that the same 13 teams which took part in 2007 would continue into 2008.

Calendar
The original calendar was released on 25 March 2008 and had a standalone event on the 31 May – 1 June at the Valencia's Ricardo Tormo circuit.  However, on the 18 April 2008, it was confirmed that a deal had been agreed for a GP2 event to run alongside the new European GP at the Valencia Street Circuit instead of the original date at the Ricardo Tormo circuit. Also, for the first time in the history of GP2, two races were held at Monaco. All of the races supported the Formula One Grands Prix indicated by the relevant flags, except the round at Valencia which supported the 2008 European Grand Prix.

Results

Championship standings
Scoring system
Points are awarded to the top 8 classified finishers in the Feature race, and to the top 6 classified finishers in the Sprint race. The pole-sitter in the feature race will also receive two points, and one point is given to the driver who set the fastest lap inside the top ten in both the feature and sprint races. No extra points are awarded to the pole-sitter in the sprint race.

Feature race points

Sprint race points
Points are awarded to the top 6 classified finishers.

Drivers' Championship

Notes:
 – Drivers did not finish the race, but were classified as they completed more than 90% of the race distance.

Teams' Championship

Notes:
 – Drivers did not finish the race, but were classified as they completed more than 90% of the race distance.

Notes

References

External links

GP2 Series & GP2 Asia Series
GP2 Series official blog
GP2/08 Technical review
Results at autosport.com
Results at sportresultaten.be

GP2 Series season 2008
GP2 Series seasons
GP2 Series